The 2010 Swiss Figure Skating Championships took place between 10 and 12 December 2009 at the Pista Resega in Lugano. Skaters competed in the disciplines of men's singles, ladies' singles, pair skating, and ice dancing on the senior level. The results were used to choose the Swiss teams to the 2009 World Championships and the 2009 European Championships.

Results

Men

Ladies

 WD = Withdrawn

Pairs

Ice dancing

External links
 2010 Swiss Figure Skating Championships
 2010 Swiss Championships results

Swiss Figure Skating Championships
Swiss Figure Skating Championships, 2010
2009 in figure skating